TI-15 Explorer is a calculator designed by Texas Instruments, intended for use in classes from grades 3-5.  It is the successor to the TI-12 Math Explorer.  For younger students, TI recommends the use of the TI-108. For older students, TI recommends the use of the TI-73 Explorer.

Features include a 2-line pixel display (as opposed to the 7-segment display of several other calculators), and a quiz-like "problem-solving" mode. It also supports limited scientific capabilities, such as parentheses, fixed decimal, fractions, pi, and exponents. It is recommended by Everyday Mathematics.

External links
Key features of the TI-15 Explorer

Texas Instruments calculators